The Artifice is an independent long-form online magazine that focuses on visual arts and other "unique topics." The website is collaboratively built and maintained by writers, with all articles peer-reviewed by other writers, with discussions about various types of visual media. While the platform is open to any writer, people within academia are often contributors to the magazine, which uses a WordPress platform. 

The site offers in-depth articles in the field of film, literature, anime, manga, comics, games, television, arts, animation, and the craft of writing. The content is not in the style of academic essays, nor personal blogs, it is somewhere in between these two. 

The Artifice is often read and praised by celebrities like Neil Gaiman, who notes the content as "remarkable." 

Currently, the Pennsylvania State University, University of Texas at Austin, University of Chicago, University of British Columbia, University of Illinois at Urbana–Champaign, University of Florida, Ohio State University, University of California, Irvine, Purdue University, Michigan State University, University of Arizona, University of Toronto, University of Waterloo, Australian National University, University of Sydney, and many others promote The Artifice as a writing opportunity for students, staff, and faculty.

History and profile
The Artifice was founded in October 2009 by Misagh Alami. It grew from 1 million fans on Facebook in December 2009 to 2.5 million fans in February 2010. By 2012, the site had 4.5 million followers on Facebook. In 2014 and 2015, they connected with University of Florida and George Mason University regarding contributors to the magazine.
Around the same time, the Reed College Linguistics Department, and Rowan University shared promotional messages while the departments of James Madison University and Savannah College of Art and Design encouraged students to write for the publication. Marymount Manhattan College highlighted a student published in the magazine, while Villanova's English Department, University of New England, and University of Massachusetts Amherst Art Department, encouraged their students to write for it.

The magazine also has spin-off sites for films, games, and anime, titled "Abridged Series," "Screenfice," "Gamefice," "Animefice".

In December 2020, The Artifice launched the sister-site vTubie, the biggest platform for Virtual YouTubers. VTubers are livestreamers who are typically animated on the screen.

Writing process 
The model of the writing process is divided into three major processes: Planning, Writing, and Reviewing. The Artifice is designed to encourage collaboration between writers on each phase. To help writers find a good topic to explore, the platform offers Topics. With this feature, writers can explore user submitted topics and also make their own topic suggestions. Once an article has been submitted for review, it will be available for processing by upper-tier writers who can provide helpful feedback to improve the content. 

The peer-reviewed editorial system is in place to make sure published articles contain high-quality content, formatting unity, and professional credibility.

Once a writer gets published, they gain the ability to process submissions, work in collaboration with prospective writers, and thus decide what type of material meets their own standards.

Readership 
The magazine's audience has grown rapidly since its inception. As of September 2020, it is estimated to be read by an audience of millions, with a significant social media impact, having more than 3,500,000 followers on Facebook alone. 

The majority of their audience are from English-speaking countries, with the United States, United Kingdom, Australia, and Canada at the very top.

The Artifice is often read and praised by celebrities like fantasy writer Neil Gaiman, who notes the content as "remarkable," and musician Clint Mansell, whose work is frequently covered in the magazine. Many celebrities, like Thomas Maier, the author of Masters of Sex, posts comments on articles and engages directly with the readers. 

A variety of academic institutions recommend The Artifice to their students, faculty, and staff, including:

US

 University of Arizona,
 Art Academy of Cincinnati, 
 Ball State University, 
 Belmont University, 
 Bluffton University, 
 Brandeis University, 
 Brooklyn College, 
 Boston Architectural College, 
 Boston University, 
 Brigham Young University,
 Buffalo State College, 
 California College of the Arts, 
 University of California, Irvine,
 University of California, Santa Barbara, 
 California State University, Fullerton, 
 California State University, Northridge, 
 Centenary University, 
 University of Chicago, 
 University of Cincinnati, 
 University of Colorado Boulder, 
 Columbia College Chicago, 
 Curry College, 
 DePaul University, 
 Drake University, 
 Edgewood College, 
 Edinboro University, 
 Emerson College, 
 Ferrum College, 
 University of Florida, 
 Florida Gulf Coast University, 
 Florida State University, 
 George Mason University, 
 Georgia Institute of Technology, 
 Hampden-Sydney College, 
 Hollins University, 
 Hope College, 
 University of Illinois at Chicago, 
 University of Illinois at Urbana–Champaign,
 Indiana University, 
 Iowa State University, 
 James Madison University, 
 Johnson C. Smith University, 
 Kenyon College, 
 Lindenwood University – Belleville, 
 Louisiana State University Shreveport, 
 Loyola Marymount University, 
 University of Massachusetts Amherst, 
 University of Massachusetts Boston, 
Mayville State University,  
Miami University,
 Middle Tennessee State University,
 University of Missouri – Kansas city, 
 Michigan State University,
 University of Nebraska - Lincoln,
 University of New England, 
 Northeastern University, 
 Oberlin College, 
 Ohio State University,
 University of Oregon, 
 Parsons School of Design, 
 Pennsylvania State University,
 Pitzer College, 
 Portland State University, 
 Purdue University,
 Purdue University Fort Wayne, 
 Reed College, 
 Roger Williams University, 
 Rowan University, 
 University of San Diego, 
 Savannah College of Art and Design, 
 University of South Florida, 
 South Georgia State College, 
 Spalding University, 
 St. John Fisher College, 
 St. John's College, 
 St. Mary's University, Texas, 
 State University of New York at Potsdam, 
 Stockton University, 
 Suffolk University, 
 University of Tennessee, 
 Texas Southern University, 
 The College of New Jersey, 
 University of Texas at Austin,
 University of Utah, 
 Villanova University, 
 Washington and Lee University, 
 Western Connecticut State University, 
 West Virginia University, 
 University of Wisconsin–Madison, 

Canada

 Academy Canada, 
 Bishop's University, 
 University of British Columbia,
 Brock University, 
 University of Calgary, 
 Carleton University, 
 Concordia University, 
 Durham College, 
 Emily Carr University of Art and Design, 
 University of Guelph, 
 Holland College, 
 Kwantlen Polytechnic University, 
 University of Lethbridge,
 University of Manitoba, 
 University of Montreal, 
 Mount Saint Vincent University, 
 University of Ottawa, 
 University of Quebec at Montreal, 
 University of Regina, 
 Ryerson University,
 Sheridan College, 
 University of Toronto, 
 University of Victoria, 
 Vancouver Community College, 
 University of Waterloo,
 University of Western Ontario,
 Wilfrid Laurier University, 
 University of Windsor, 
 York University, 

Australia

 Australian National University,
 Deakin University, 
 Flinders University, 
 Griffith University, 
 Macquarie University, 
 Monash University, 
 RMIT University, 
 University of Southern Queensland, 
 Swinburne University of Technology, 
 University of Sydney,
 University of Queensland, 
 Queensland University of Technology, 
 University of Western Australia, 

England

 Birkbeck, University of London, 
 Brunel University London, 
 Goldsmiths, University of London, 
 University of Leeds,

Content 
The magazine's content features a variety of topics within the arts spectrum. This includes deep dives into artists and franchises like J.R.R. Tolkien, Harry Potter, Star Wars, Disney, and H.P. Lovecraft, with everything from the humanitarian topics gender roles, identity, feminism, racism, LGBT+, to concepts like fandom, morality, fairy tales, adaptation, superheroes, otaku, and science fiction.

Sister-sites 
The Artifice has a network of spin-off sites, currently including:

Abridged Series, a comprehensive database and community for abridged series, a subgenre of video parodies that involves narrating a condensed version of popular media, often filled with comedic redubbing.

Animefice, a reddit style platform focusing on anime and manga where the stream of content is curated by the community. 

Gamefice and Screenfice work the same as Animefice, but with a focus on gaming culture, film, and television. 

vTubie, currently the biggest platform for Virtual YouTubers (VTubers). They are livestreamers who are typically animated on the screen.

References

External links
 Official website

Online magazines
Visual arts magazines
Cultural magazines
Magazines established in 2009
2009 establishments in Sweden